Regional elections were held in Denmark on 21 November 1989.  4737 municipal council members were elected to the 1990–1993 term of office in the 275 municipalities, as well as 374 members of the 14 counties of Denmark.

Results of regional elections
The results of the regional elections:

County Councils

Municipal Councils

References

1989
1989 elections in Denmark
November 1989 events in Europe